Bekipay is a town and commune in Madagascar. It belongs to the district of Mitsinjo, which is a part of Boeny Region. The population of the commune was estimated to be approximately 14,000 in 2001 commune census.

Only primary schooling is available. The majority 50% of the population of the commune are farmers, while an additional 48% receives their livelihood from raising livestock. The most important crops are rice and raffia palm, while other important agricultural products are sugarcane and cassava.  Services provide employment for 2% of the population.

References and notes 

Populated places in Boeny